Olo (Orlei) is a non-Austronesian, Torricelli language of Papua New Guinea. The language is spoken in 55 villages, from the Aitape Township (north) to the Sandaun Province (south), and is at risk of going extinct. Olo is believed to be a Goal Oriented Activation language, meaning the speaker chooses their words with an idea of what they are trying to achieve with the listener in mind, this has been labeled as referential theory. Referential theory has been divided into four groupings, all of which come with disadvantages, recency, episodes, prominence, and memorial activation.

Classification 
Olo derives from the Torricelli language Phylum and belongs to the Wape Family. The two dialects that are spoken are Payi()Pay) and Wapi (Wape). The dialect boundaries are not absolute and are based on the prominent differences in grammar. Despite the differences, they share dialect chaining.

Phonology

Nouns  
Nominal plural formatives include:

{| 
! gloss !! singular !! plural
|-
| ‘ear’ || mingi || mingim
|-
| ‘banana’ || tefa || tefas
|-
| ‘betelnut’ || mere || meri
|-
| ‘garden’ || liom || lipes
|-
| ‘coconut’ || wom || wefes
|-
| ‘boar’ || wasene || wasem
|-
| ‘wound’ || pam || pape
|-
| ‘seasoning’ || num || nus
|-
| ‘hand’ || eti || esi
|-
| ‘branch’ || uno || ine
|-
| ‘wing’ || naru || nare
|-
| ‘liver’ || pale || palu
|}

Consonants 
The chart below includes the consonants used in the Olo language, /p,t,k,f,s,m,n,ŋ,w,y/. Three types of nasals are used when speaking this language, alveolar, bilabial, and velar. Alveolar nasals occur near the teeth, /n/, bilabial nasals occur at the base of the tongue in close proximity to the roof of the mouth towards the beginning of the throat, and velar nasals occur on the lips. A rule of Olo is that a velar nasal only happens before a velar stop. Stops are not executed on the exhalation of breathe, making them weakly articulated.

Vowels 
According to phonology, Olo has seven vowels, but orthography acknowledges five, /ɪ/ and /ʊ/ are usually seen as "i" and "u".

Semantics

Structure 
Olo is classified as an SVO (subject, verb, object) language under normal circumstance, but, in certain cases, the object can be fronted, the subject can continue on as a free noun, or there can be occurrences similar to passive tense in English. The prefixes that attach to the verb serves as markers for the subjects and gives the listener information about the person, number and gender. the object's person, number, and gender is identified by the suffix or infix. [Person: first, second, third; Number: singular, dual, plural; Gender: masculine, feminine.]

Subject prefix

Verbs that begin with a vowel take the prefix. Verbs that start with /r/ and /l/ are the only verbs that begin with a consonant that can take on a verbal prefix.

Object infixes

Object suffixes 
Suffixes, and some infixes, indicate first or second person objects and applies to all transitive verbs. When an infix is used to describe an object's first or second person, if the first syllable contains /a/ or /e/, then it transforms into /ei/.

There is a fundamental difference between -(w)o and -o, -o follows the vowel /i/ and -wo follows in all other scenarios.

References

Wapei languages
Languages of Sandaun Province